Authors from many nations have written literature in the Esperanto language, a constructed international auxiliary language with an estimated two million speakers worldwide.

Alphabetical list of notable authors

References

 
Esperanto